The Cleanser is a 2021 Nigerian thriller film produced and written by Mathew Alajogun and directed by James Abinibi. The film stars Kehinde Bankole, Bolanle Ninalowo, Alex Osifo and Antar Laniyan in the lead roles. The plot of the film revolves around the life of a man whose ambition is to eradicate the corrupted politicians. The film had its theatrical release on 22 January 2021 and opened to mixed reviews from critics.

Cast 

 Kehinde Bankole
 Bolanle Ninalowo
 Alex Osifo
 Antar Laniyan
 Jide Kosoko
 Chiwetalu Agu
 Stan Nze
 Nkechi Blessing

Production 
The film trailer of the film which was unveiled on 8 January 2021 indicated that the film was directed by James Abinibi. However, according to BBC the film was directed by Mathew Alajogun (on his directorial debut) who is a Nigerian currently resides in the United Kingdom. It was reported that Mathew developed an interest in making the film and progressed with the support he obtained from the MetFilm School in Manchester.

References 

2021 thriller films
Yoruba-language films
Nigerian thriller films